The 2018 Ykkönen was the 47th season of Ykkönen, the second highest football league in Finland. The season began on 28 April 2018 and ended on 27 October 2018. The winning team was directly promoted to the 2019 Veikkausliiga, while the second-placed team played a play-off against the eleventh-placed team from Veikkausliiga to decide who would play in that division. The bottom two teams were relegated to Kakkonen.

Overview

A total of ten teams contested in the league, including five sides from the 2017 season, HIFK and JJK who was relegated from Veikkausliiga and Klubi 04 and AC Kajaani who were promoted from Kakkonen after winning the promotion play-offs.

OPS, who was refused a license for Ykkönen, was replaced by FC KTP.

GrIFK and Gnistan were relegated from 2017 Ykkönen.

TPS, the champion of 2017 Ykkönen and FC Honka, the runner-up of 2017 Ykkönen were promoted to the 2018 Veikkausliiga.

League table

References

Ykkönen seasons
Fin
Fin
2018 in Finnish football leagues